Persatuan Sepakbola Kota Bima or Persekobi is an Indonesian football club based in Bima, West Nusa Tenggara. They currently compete in the Liga 3.

They main rival is Persebi Bima, a club based in Bima Regency. The derby often called Bima Derby.

References

Football clubs in Indonesia
Football clubs in West Nusa Tenggara
Association football clubs established in 2003
2003 establishments in Indonesia